Bosansko Grahovo is a town and municipality located in Canton 10 of the Federation of Bosnia and Herzegovina, an entity of Bosnia and Herzegovina. It is situated in western Bosnia and Herzegovina along the border with Croatia.

History
Gavrilo Princip, the main perpetrator of the assassination of Archduke Franz Ferdinand in Sarajevo in 1914, was born in the village of Obljaj located just east of Bosansko Grahovo.

From 1929 to 1941, Bosansko Grahovo was part of the Vrbas Banovina of the Kingdom of Yugoslavia. In the Drvar uprising Grahovo was captured by the Serb rebels commanded by Branko Bogunović. Bogunović joined Yugoslav Army in the Fatherland and in September 1941 he was appointed as commander of the Chetnik Regiment "Gavrilo Princip" from Grahovo.

During the Bosnian War, the city was held by Bosnian Serb forces. The Croatian Army captured the city in July 1995, during Operation Summer '95. The offensive displaced a large number of Serb refugees. After the war, the Serb civilians returned, and today they constitute the majority of population in the municipality. However, nowadays the population is much smaller, having declined from 9,000 to about 2,500.

Settlements

 Bastasi
 Bosansko Grahovo
 Crnac
 Crni Lug
 Donje Peulje
 Donji Kazanci
 Donji Tiškovac
 Duler
 Gornje Peulje
 Gornji Kazanci
 Grkovci
 Isjek
 Jaruga
 Kesići
 Korita
 Luka
 Maleševci
 Malo Tičevo
 Marinkovci
 Mračaj
 Nuglašica
 Obljaj
 Pečenci
 Peći
 Preodac
 Pržine
 Radlovići
 Resanovci
 Stožišta
 Ugarci
 Uništa
 Veliko Tičevo
 Vidovići
 Zaseok
 Zebe

Demographics

Population

Ethnic composition

Notable people
 Dragan Raca, basketball coach
 Đuro Pucar, politician
 Gavrilo Princip, assassin of Archduke Franz Ferdinand of Austria-Hungary
 Milan Galić, footballer

See also
 Canton 10

References

Sources

External links

 Grahovo official website

 
Serb communities in the Federation of Bosnia and Herzegovina
Populated places in Bosansko Grahovo